Isaac Manuel Francisco Albéniz y Pascual (29 May 1860 – 18 May 1909) was a Spanish virtuoso pianist, composer, and conductor. He is one of the foremost composers of the Post-Romantic era who also had a significant influence on his contemporaries and younger composers. He is best known for his piano works based on Spanish folk music idioms. Isaac Albéniz was close to the Generation of '98.

Transcriptions of many of his pieces, such as Asturias (Leyenda), Granada, Sevilla, Cadiz, Córdoba, Cataluña, Mallorca, and Tango in D, are important pieces for classical guitar, though he never composed for the guitar. The personal papers of Albéniz are preserved in, among other institutions, the Library of Catalonia.

Life 

Born in Camprodon, province of Girona, to Ángel Albéniz (a customs official) and his wife, Maria de los Dolores Pascual, Albéniz was a child prodigy who first performed at the age of four. At age seven, after apparently taking lessons from Antoine François Marmontel, he passed the entrance examination for piano at the Conservatoire de Paris, but he was refused admission because he was believed to be too young. By the time he had reached 12, he had made many attempts to run away from home.

His concert career began at the age of nine when his father toured both Isaac and his sister, Clementina, throughout northern Spain. A popular myth is that at the age of twelve Albéniz stowed away in a ship bound for Buenos Aires. He then found himself in Cuba, then in the United States, giving concerts in New York and San Francisco and then travelled to Liverpool, London and Leipzig. By age 15, he had already given concerts worldwide. This story is not entirely false, Albéniz did travel the world as a performer; however, he was accompanied by his father, who as a customs agent was required to travel frequently. This can be attested by comparing Isaac's concert dates with his father's travel itinerary.

In 1876, after a short stay at the Leipzig Conservatory, he went to study at the Royal Conservatory of Brussels after King Alfonso's personal secretary, Guillermo Morphy, obtained him a royal grant. Count Morphy thought highly of Albéniz, who would later dedicate Sevilla to Morphy's wife when it premiered in Paris in January 1886.

In 1880 Albéniz went to Budapest, Hungary, to study with Franz Liszt, only to find out that Liszt was in Weimar, Germany.

In 1883 he met the teacher and composer Felip Pedrell, who inspired him to write Spanish music such as the Chants d'Espagne. The first movement (Prelude) of that suite, later retitled after the composer's death as Asturias (Leyenda), is now part of the classical guitar repertoire, even though it was originally composed for piano. Many of Albéniz's other compositions were also transcribed for guitar by Francisco Tárrega. At the 1888 Barcelona Universal Exposition, the piano manufacturer Érard sponsored a series of 20 concerts featuring Albéniz's music.

The apex of Albéniz's concert career is considered to be 1889 to 1892 when he had concert tours throughout Europe. During the 1890s Albéniz lived in London and Paris. For London he wrote some musical comedies which brought him to the attention of the wealthy Francis Money-Coutts, 5th Baron Latymer. Money-Coutts commissioned and provided him with librettos for the opera Henry Clifford and for a projected trilogy of Arthurian operas. The first of these, Merlin (1898–1902), was thought to have been lost but has recently been reconstructed and performed. Albéniz never completed Lancelot (only the first act is finished, as a vocal and piano score), and he never began Guinevere, the final part.

In 1900 he started to suffer from Bright's disease and returned to writing piano music. Between 1905 and 1908 he composed his final masterpiece, Iberia (1908), a suite of twelve piano "impressions".

In 1883 the composer married his student Rosina Jordana. They had two children who lived into adulthood: Laura (a painter) and Alfonso (who played for Real Madrid in the early 1900s before embarking on a career as a diplomat). Another child, Blanca, died in 1886, and two other children died in infancy. His great-granddaughter is Cécilia Attias, former wife of Nicolas Sarkozy.

Albéniz died from his kidney disease on 18 May 1909 at age 48 in Cambo-les-Bains, in Labourd, south-western France. Only a few weeks before his death, the French Government bestowed upon Albéniz the Legion of Honour, its highest honour. He is buried at the Montjuïc Cemetery, Barcelona.

Music

Early works 

Albéniz's early works were mostly "salon style" music. Albéniz's first published composition, Marcha Militar, appeared in 1868. A number of works written before this are now lost. He continued composing in traditional styles ranging from Jean-Philippe Rameau, Johann Sebastian Bach, Ludwig van Beethoven, Frédéric Chopin and Franz Liszt until the mid-1880s. He also wrote at least five zarzuelas, of which all but two are now lost.

Perhaps the best source on the works is Albéniz himself. He is quoted as commenting on his earlier period works as:There are among them a few things that are not completely worthless. The music is a bit infantile, plain, spirited; but in the end, the people, our Spanish people, are something of all that. I believe that the people are right when they continue to be moved by Córdoba, Mallorca, by the copla of the Sevillanas, by the Serenata, and Granada. In all of them I now note that there is less musical science, less of the grand idea, but more colour, sunlight, flavour of olives. That music of youth, with its little sins and absurdities that almost point out the sentimental affectation ... appears to me like the carvings in the Alhambra, those peculiar arabesques that say nothing with their turns and shapes, but which are like the air, like the sun, like the blackbirds or like the nightingales of its gardens. They are more valuable than all else of Moorish Spain, which though we may not like it, is the true Spain.

Middle period 

During the late 1880s, the strong influence of Spanish style is evident in Albéniz's music. In 1883 Albéniz met the teacher and composer Felipe Pedrell. Pedrell was a leading figure in the development of nationalist Spanish music. In his book The Music of Spain, Gilbert Chase describes Pedrell's influence on Albéniz: "What Albéniz derived from Pedrell was above all a spiritual orientation, the realization of the wonderful values inherent in Spanish music." Felipe Pedrell inspired Albéniz to write Spanish music such as the Suite española, Op. 47, noted for its delicate, intricate melody and abrupt dynamic changes.

In addition to the Spanish spirit infused in Albéniz's music, he incorporated other qualities as well. In her biography of Albéniz, Pola Baytelman discerns four characteristics of the music from the middle period as follows:

1. The dance rhythms of Spain, of which there are a wide variety. 2. The use of cante jondo, which means deep or profound singing. It is the most serious and moving variety of flamenco or Spanish gypsy song, often dealing with themes of death, anguish, or religion. 3. The use of exotic scales also associated with flamenco music. The Phrygian mode is the most prominent in Albéniz's music, although he also used the Aeolian and Mixolydian modes as well as the whole-tone scale. 4. The transfer of guitar idioms into piano writing. 

Following his marriage, Albéniz settled in Madrid, Spain and produced a substantial quantity of music in a relatively short period. By 1886 he had written over 50 piano pieces. Albéniz biographer Walter A. Clark says that pieces from this period received enthusiastic reception in the composer's many concerts. Chase describes music from this period,

Taking the guitar as his instrumental model, and drawing his inspiration largely from the peculiar traits of Andalusian folk music—but without using actual folk themes—Albéniz achieves a stylization of Spanish traditional idioms that while thoroughly artistic, gives a captivating impression of spontaneous improvisation... Córdoba is the piece that best represents the style of Albéniz in this period, with its hauntingly beautiful melody, set against the acrid dissonances of the plucked accompaniment imitating the notes of the Moorish guslas. Here is the heady scent of jasmines amid the swaying palm trees, the dream fantasy of an Andalusian "Arabian Nights" in which Albéniz loved to let his imagination dwell.

Later period 

While Albéniz's crowning achievement, Iberia, was written in the last years of his life in France, many of its preceding works are well-known and of great interest. The five pieces in Chants d'Espagne, (Songs of Spain, published in 1892) are a solid example of the compositional ideas he was exploring in the "middle period" of his life. The suite shows what Albéniz biographer Walter Aaron Clark describes as the "first flowering of his unique creative genius", and the beginnings of compositional exploration that became the hallmark of his later works. This period also includes his operatic works—Merlin, Henry Clifford, and Pepita Jiménez. His orchestral works of this period include Spanish Rhapsody (1887) and Catalonia (1899), dedicated to Ramon Casas, who had painted his full-length portrait in 1894.

Impact 

As one of the leading composers of his era, Albéniz's influences on both contemporary composers and on the future of Spanish music are profound. As a result of his extended stay in France and the friendship he formed with numerous composers there, his composition technique and harmonic language has influenced aspiring younger composers such as Claude Debussy and Maurice Ravel. His activities as conductor, performer and composer significantly raised the profile of Spanish music abroad and encouraged Spanish music and musicians in his own country.

Albéniz's works have become an important part of the repertoire of the classical guitar, many of which have been transcribed by Francisco Tárrega, Miguel Llobet and others. Asturias (Leyenda) in particular is heard most often on the guitar, as are Granada, Sevilla, Cadiz, Cataluña, Córdoba, Mallorca, and Tango in D. Gordon Crosskey and Cuban-born guitarist Manuel Barrueco have both made solo guitar arrangements of all the eight-movements in Suite española. Selections from Iberia have rarely been attempted on solo guitar but have been very effectively performed by guitar ensembles, such as the performance by John Williams and Julian Bream of Iberia's  opening "Evocation". The Doors incorporated "Asturias" into their song "Spanish Caravan"; also, Iron Maiden's "To Tame a Land" uses the introduction of the piece for the song bridge. More recently, a guitar version of Granada functions as something of a love theme in Woody Allen's 2008 film Vicky Cristina Barcelona.

The theme from Asturias was incorporated or adapted in several soundtracks including the 2008 horror film Mirrors, composed by Javier Navarrete, and the Netflix TV show Godless, composed by Carlos Rafael Rivera.

In 1997 the Fundación Isaac Albéniz was founded to promote Spanish music and musicians and to act as a research centre for Albéniz and Spanish music in general.

A street in Quito, Ecuador, is named after him.

In film 

A film about his life entitled Albéniz was made in 1947. It was produced in Argentina.

References and sources 

References

Sources

Further reading 

 Alarcón Hernández, Joana; et al. Isaac Albéniz, artistes i mecenes. Barcelona: Museu Diocesà de Barcelona, 2009.  
 Albéniz, Isaac. Chants d'Espagne, G. Henle Verlag, Berlin, 2004. 
 Albéniz, Isaac. Impresiones y diarios de viaje. [Madrid]: Fundación Isaac Albéniz, DL 1990.  
 Amat Cortes, Joan. Isaac Albéniz, un català universal. [Barcelona]: Cevagraf, DL 1998. 
 Aviñoa, Xosé. Albéniz. Madrid; Barcelona [etc.]: Daimon, cop. 1986. 
 Aviñoa, Xosé. La música i el Modernisme. Barcelona: Curial, 1985. (Biblioteca de cultura catalana (Curial Edicions Catalanes); 58).  
 Aviñoa, Xosé. Modernisme i Modernistes – Musica i Modernisme: Definició i Període. Lunwerg editores, 2001. 
 Baytelman, Pola. Isaac Albéniz: Chronological List and Thematic Catalog of His Piano Works, Harmonie Park Press, Michigan 1993.
 Clark, Walter Aaron. Isaac Albéniz: A Guide to Research, Garland Publishing Inc. New York & London, 1998.
 Ericourt, Daniel; Erickson, Robert. P. MasterClasses in Spanish Piano Music, Hinshaw Music, Chapel Hill North Carolina, 1984.
 Gauthier, André. Albéniz. Madrid: Espasa Calpe, 1978. (Clásicos de la música).  
 Guerra y Alarcón, Antonio. Isaac Albéniz. Notas crítico-biográficas de tan eminente pianista. [S.l.]: Fundación Isaac Albéniz, DL 1990.  
 Heras, Antonio de las. Vida de Albéniz. Barcelona: Ediciones Patria, [1942]. 
 Iglesias, Antonio. Isaac Albéniz : su obra para piano. 2 vols. Madrid: Alpuerto, DL 1987.  
 Jean-Aubry, G. "Isaac Albéniz 1860–1909", in The Musical Times, vol 58, no. 898, December 1917 pp. 535–538. 
 Kalfa, Jacqueline. Isaac Albéniz (1860–1909) : la vocation de l'Espagne. Paris: Séguier, 2000. (Carré Musique; 4).  
 Marco, Thomas. Spanish Music in the Twentieth Century. 1993.
 Martorell, Oriol; Valls, Manuel. Síntesi històrica de la música catalana. Sant Cugat del Vallès: Els llibres de la frontera, 1985. 
 Montero Alonso, José. Albéniz, España en "suite". Madrid: Editorial Silex, 1988. 
 Morales, Luisa; Clark, Walter A. Antes de Iberia : de Masarnau a Albéniz : actas del Symposium FIMTE 2008 = Pre-Iberia : from Masarnau to Albéniz : proceedings of FIMTE Symposium 2008. Garrucha: Leal; [Granada]: Centro de Documentación Musical de Andalucía, cop. 2009. (Series FIMTE; 3). 
 Pedrell, Felip. Concierto de Albéniz. Madrid: Fundación Isaac Albéniz, 1990. 
 Pérez Senz, Javier. Isaac Albéniz, 1860–1909. Cents anys : un geni romàntic. Barcelona: Institut de Cultura, Departament de Cultura i Mitjans de Comunicació, 2008. (Quaderns de l'Auditori; 7). 
 Reverter, Arturo. Albéniz-Arbós, historia de una amistad. Madrid: Scherzo, 1989. 
 Romero, Justo. Isaac Albéniz. Barcelona: Península, 2002. (Guías Scherzo; 14).  
 Ruiz Albéniz, Victor. Isaac Albéniz. Madrid: Comisaría General de Música, 1948. 
 Salazar, Adolfo. "Isaac Albéniz y los albores del renacimiento musical en España", en Revista de Occidente, vol. 12 (Madrid, 1926), pp. 99–107. 
 Sempronio. Retrats de Ramon Casas. Barcelona: Edicions Polígrafa, 1970. 
 Torres, Jacinto. Las claves Madrileñas de Isaac Albéniz. Imprenta Artesanal de Madrid, 2009. 
 Torres Mulas, Jacinto. Catálogo sistemático descriptivo de las obras musicales de Isaac Albéniz. Madrid : Instituto de Bibliografía Musical, DL 2001.  
 Villalba, Luis. Imagen distanciada de un compositor-pianista. Madrid: Fundación Isaac Albéniz, 1990. 
 Albéniz : edición conmemorativa del centenario de Isaac Albéniz 1909–2009. [Madrid]: Ministerio de Cultura, Sociedad Cultural de Conmemoraciones Culturales, DL 2009. 
 Albéniz : leyendas y verdades : Conde Duque. Sala de las Bóvedas del 11 de noviembre de 2009 al 31 de enero de 2010. Madrid: Centro Cultural del Conde Duque. Ayuntamiento de Madrid, Sociedad Estatal de Conmemoraciones Culturales, 2009.

External links 

 
 
 Albéniz Foundation
 
 Personal papers of Isaac Albéniz in the Biblioteca de Catalunya
 En torno a Isaac Albéniz y su "Iberia" by Antonio Iglesias, Antonio Fernández-Cid (ref)
 Facsimiles (La Biblioteca Virtual Miguel de Cervantes)
 Improvisación nº 1, Improvisación nº 2, Improvisación nº 3 (ref  – La Biblioteca Virtual Miguel de Cervantes)
 Photos (Gallica)
 L'escola pianística catalana (Enregistraments històrics) (la mà de guido , LMG3060)
 The Catalan Piano Tradition (VAI Audio, 1001) 
 Rollos de Pianola (Obras de Albéniz, Granados, Turina, Ocón, Chapí, Alonso y Otros) (Almaviva, DS – 0141)
 Tango, arranged by Mischa Elman for violin and piano (from the Sibley Music Library Digital Scores Collection)

1860 births
1909 deaths
19th-century classical composers
19th-century classical pianists
19th-century Spanish composers
19th-century Spanish male musicians
20th-century classical composers
20th-century classical pianists
20th-century Spanish composers
20th-century Spanish male musicians
Burials at Montjuïc Cemetery
Classical composers from Catalonia
Catalan pianists
Composers for piano
Deaths from nephritis
Male classical pianists
Male opera composers
Pupils of Salomon Jadassohn
Pupils of Vincent d'Indy
Spanish classical composers
Spanish classical pianists
Spanish male classical composers
Spanish opera composers
Spanish Romantic composers
University of Music and Theatre Leipzig alumni